Ayot St Peter is a village and civil parish in the Welwyn Hatfield district of Hertfordshire, England, about two miles north-west of Welwyn Garden City.  According to the 2001 census it had a population of 166. At the 2011 Census the population including the nearby Ayot Green and Ayot St Lawrence was 245.

References

External links

  Ayot St Peter (A Guide to Old Hertfordshire)
 

Villages in Hertfordshire
Civil parishes in Hertfordshire